The Salpa Line Museum was established and opened in 1987 by the Miehikkälä municipality and World War II veteran organisations. It is the first museum established belonging to the museums of Miehikkälä. The other museum is Miehikkälän kotiseutumuseo, the Miehikkala local arts-and-crafts museum, which was established in 1989 and is in the same building as the Engineers Museum.

The Salpa Line Museum is the core of the Salpa Centre. It is both the tourist information centre of the Salpa Line Museum, the Engineer Museum and the Bunker Museum and the Salpa Line Museum centre itself.

The area around was built as a defence line and the defence centre of an infantry company in 1940-1944. It was never used for defence as the front line never reached the area due to the truce of 5 September 1944 and the Moscow Armistice of 19 September 1944.

Some of the preserved Salpa Line areas are classified by Finland's National Board of Antiquities  to the Built-up cultural environments of national importance1 (Valtakunnallisesti merkittävät rakennetut kulttuuriympäristöt – Byggda kulturmiljöer av riksintresse1). The territory of the Salpa Line Museum belongs to the one of the four such areas in Miehikkälä: Kylmälä, Miehikkälä municipal cente, Muurula  and Myllylampi.

Exhibits

Due to the nature of the museum, most collections are located outside in the woods. Some bunkers from World War II remain. Outside the museum centre building, there are several anti-tank guns.

Gallery

Open hours

References

Museums in South Karelia
Military engineering
Technology museums in Finland
Museums established in 1987
Military and war museums in Finland